Carlos Agustín Farías (born December 25, 1987, in Buenos Aires, Argentina), known as Agustín Farías, is an Argentine-born Chilean footballer that currently plays for Chilean club Palestino as a midfielder.

Personal life
He acquired the Chilean nationality by permanent residency, after receiving his naturalization certificate on March 3, 2021.

Honours

Player
Nueva Chicago
 Primera B Metropolitana (1): 2013–14

APOEL
 Cypriot First Division (1): 2017–18

Palestino
Copa Chile (1): 2018

References

External links
 
 

1987 births
Living people
Argentine footballers
Argentine expatriate footballers
Naturalized citizens of Chile
Club Almagro players
Club Atlético Banfield footballers
Nueva Chicago footballers
Club Deportivo Palestino footballers
APOEL FC players
Argentine Primera División players
Primera Nacional players
Chilean Primera División players
Cypriot First Division players
Expatriate footballers in Chile
Expatriate footballers in Cyprus
Association football midfielders
Footballers from Buenos Aires